Warren Evan Spector (born October 2, 1955) is an American role-playing and video game designer, director, writer, producer and production designer. He is known for creating immersive sim games, which give players a wide variety of choices in how to progress. Consequences of those choices are then shown in the simulated game world in subsequent levels or missions. He is best known for the critically acclaimed video game Deus Ex that embodies the choice and consequence philosophy while combining elements of the first-person shooter, role-playing, and adventure game genres. In addition to Deus Ex, Spector is known for his work while employed by Looking Glass Studios, where he was involved in the creation of several acclaimed titles including Ultima Underworld, Ultima Underworld II, System Shock, and Thief: The Dark Project. He is employed by OtherSide Entertainment, where he was part of the development team for now-cancelled System Shock 3. He is currently working on a new immersive sim based on an original intellectual property.

Early life
Spector grew up in Manhattan, which he described as a sometimes hostile environment where "short, pudgy, Jewish kids didn't fare well". He showed an intense devotion to whatever topic became his focus at any given time, from dinosaurs and airplanes as a small boy, to an interest in law by the sixth grade. At age 13, Spector had decided he wanted to be a film critic, and by high school, his interests expanded to include cars and basketball.

Spector and game designer Greg Costikyan were friends since high school.

Spector attended Northwestern University in Illinois, still intending to become a film critic, stating that he "knew more about movies than a lot of my teachers". Spector earned his BS in Communications at Northwestern, and went on to earn his MA in Radio-TV-Film at the University of Texas at Austin in 1980.  His thesis was a critical history of Warner Bros. cartoons.

All through college, Spector enjoyed gaming, and recalls that he "played Avalon Hill games mainly, and a lot of OGRE and G.E.V. games, and Rivets from Metagaming. It was all boardgames until I became friends with science-fiction writers who were into D&D games, so I gave the game a try. I was hooked." Spector taught several undergraduate classes at the University of Texas at Austin, on the history, theory, and criticism of film.

Career

Tabletop role-playing games
In 1983, after a job at the Harry Ransom Center as an archivist in charge of the David O. Selznick collection ended after a few months, Spector recalls that he "was sitting around, wondering how I was going to pay the next month's rent, when I got a call from Chris Frink. He was a writer for a weekly entertainment magazine I used to edit in college. Anyway, he said that he was now editor of Space Gamer magazine and asked if I wanted a job. So, in the fall of 1983, I started as an editor." Within a short time, Spector became the editor-in-chief for all Steve Jackson Games products, the company that owned and published Space Gamer magazine. Spector began producing role-playing games for the company, stating, "I supervised game development, typesetting, and the art and graphic departments." Greg Costikyan developed Toon (1984), based on an idea by Jeff Dee; Costikyan only intended the game to be an article in Fantasy Gamer magazine, but Spector liked the idea and expanded it into a complete role-playing system, publishing it as the first full role-playing game from Steve Jackson Games. Spector wrote the early Paranoia game supplement Send in the Clones (1985) with Allen Varney. Spector also worked on the GURPS role-playing game. In March 1987 he was hired by TSR, initially working on games such as Top Secret/S.I. and the Marvel Super Heroes role-playing game. He also worked on The Bullwinkle and Rocky Party Roleplaying Game, and the second edition AD&D rules set, as well as board games, choose-your-own-adventure books, and novels. Spector spent some time in TSR's R&D department, helping launch, among other things, Spelljammer.

Origin and Looking Glass Studios
In 1989, Spector entered the video game industry and joined Origin, where he co-produced Ultima VI and Wing Commander and produced Ultima Underworld and Ultima Underworld II, Ultima VII Part Two: Serpent Isle, System Shock, Wings of Glory, Bad Blood, Martian Dreams, and others. He later became general manager of Looking Glass Austin. He worked briefly on Dark Camelot, which later became Thief: The Dark Project. However, Spector left Looking Glass soon afterward, just before Thief shipped, to pursue other interests. According to Spector, his decision to dissolve the Austin branch was prompted by the company's ongoing financial struggles and the realization that "continued existence of the Austin Studio was going to jeopardise the existence of Looking Glass overall".

Ion Storm
In 1996, Spector was about to sign a contract with EA to do an unannounced project (which was revealed to be a "Command & Conquer Role-Playing Game") when he got a call from John Romero to join him at Ion Storm; Romero persuaded Spector by offering him the chance to make the game of his dreams with no creative interference and a big marketing budget. Spector later agreed. In 1997 he founded Ion Storm's Austin development studio, and his "dream project" later became the award-winning action/RPG called Deus Ex. As Ion Storm studio director, he oversaw development of Deus Ex: Invisible War (2003) and Thief: Deadly Shadows (2004). In 2004, Spector left Ion Storm to "pursue personal interests outside the company". Ion Storm was closed by owners Eidos Interactive in February 2005.

Disney

In 2005, it was announced that he had established a new studio Junction Point Studios. Somewhere between the end of 2005 and mid-2007, Junction Point Studios and Warren worked on an additional Episode for Half-Life 2 that was ultimately cancelled by Valve. A job advertisement for the studio called for artists for a game that has "classic Hollywood cartoons" featuring "cartoon mice, cats and wabbits". On July 13, 2007, it was announced that Disney Interactive had acquired Junction Point Studios. His first project with Disney Interactive was a project involving Disney characters, titled Epic Mickey. The game is steampunk-themed and designed exclusively for the Wii; the game was released in 2010.

In January 2013, it was announced that Warren Spector had left Disney Interactive following the closure of Junction Point Studios.

University of Texas
After leaving Disney Interactive, Spector worked with the University of Texas at Austin to build a new post-baccalaureate game development program – the Denius-Sams Gaming Academy. He worked with UT staff to create a curriculum and plan out courses and labs.

OtherSide Entertainment
In February 2016, Spector announced he had joined OtherSide Entertainment, a studio formed by Paul Neurath in 2014 and includes several previous Looking Glass developers, as their Studio Director, after having been in an advisory role from its inception. He will be helping the studio with their current development of System Shock 3 and Underworld Ascendant, the spiritual successor to Ultima Underworld which both Spector and Neurath worked on in the early 1990s. Though Spector had completed only two-and-a-half years of a three-year commitment to the University of Texas, he jumped at the chance to work on System Shock when Neurath approached him with the offer. He also believed the opportunity would help garner good favor from players that had been disappointed by his choice to work on Epic Mickey, even though he states that game had still been based on his past design philosophy used in the development of System Shock and Deus Ex. OtherSide Entertainment announced in November 2022 that Spector is working on a multiplayer game with immersive sim elements entitled Argos: Riders on the Storm.

Personal life
Warren met Caroline Chase in 1984 at a comic book store in Austin, Texas, where she was employed. After Chase got a job at Steve Jackson Games, the two began a relationship. They were married on April 11, 1987. The couple sometimes worked together, such as on game supplements for the Marvel Super Heroes role-playing game. The two reside in Austin, Texas. Caroline is a fantasy writer.

Credits

Video games

Role-playing games
 Toon – Developer (1984), Steve Jackson Games
 Bullwinkle and Rocky Role-Playing Party Game – Editor (1988), TSR, Inc.
 Uncanny X-Men Boxed Set – Editor (1990), TSR, Inc.

Novels
 Double Agent: Royal Pain/The Hollow Earth Affair by Richard Merwin/Warren Spector

Comics
 DuckTales – Boom! Studios – (2011)

Gamebooks
 One Thing After Another – Puffin Books – (Marvel Super Heroes Gamebook #5)

Awards
On 2016, Spector won the Honorific Award at the Fun & Serious Game Festival.

References

Sources

External links

 Junction Point Studios developer blog (usually Warren Spector, but sometimes other team members)
 Junction Point Studios, Inc. official website
 
 
 Spector is interviewed on a variety of game industry related topics
 Spector on Grand Theft Auto and video game violence
 Interview with Warren Spector about Ultima VII: Serpents Isle
 Interview at EuroGamer

 

1955 births
20th-century American Jews
20th-century American male writers
20th-century American novelists
21st-century American Jews
American male novelists
American video game designers
American video game producers
Dungeons & Dragons game designers
Game Developers Conference Lifetime Achievement Award recipients
GURPS writers
Jewish video game developers
Living people
Moody College of Communication alumni
Northwestern University alumni
Origin Systems people
People from Manhattan
Place of birth missing (living people)
Ultima (series)